The Black Emergency Cultural Coalition (BECC) protested a 1969 exhibition at the Metropolitan Museum of Art entitled Harlem on My Mind: Cultural Capital of Black America, 1900–1968 (18 January  to 6 April 1969). The protest resulted from conflicts between the Met and the Harlem art community after the Met's decision to exclude Black artists and the Harlem community from an exhibit about Harlem, as well as from racism and anti-Semitism within both the exhibition and exhibition catalogue.

Background

Harlem on My Mind 
Met curator and director Thomas Hoving had planned a three-month long multimedia exhibition called Harlem on My Mind intended to highlight the history of Harlem since 1900. The exhibition consisted of floor-to-ceiling introductory photomurals, and then photographs of various sizes depicting life in Harlem, but no artwork by Black artists. The accompanying catalog included a term paper written by Harlem resident and recent graduate of Theodore Roosevelt High School (New York City) Candice Van Ellison containing copious anti-semitic and anti-Irish slurs, and was subsequently pulled from publication by Hoving.  Portions of the essay can be found quoted within Bridget R. Cooks' 2011 work Exhibiting Blackness: African Americans and the American Art Museum (University of Massachusetts Press).

Black Emergency Cultural Coalition (BECC) 
The BECC was organized in January 1969 by a group of 75 African American artists in direct response to the Metropolitan Museum of Art's "Harlem on My Mind" exhibit. The co-chairmen at the time of creation were Benny Andrews, Henri Ghent, and Edward Taylor.

Defacement 

On January 16, 1969, ten paintings were defaced in response to the Harlem on My Mind exhibit. Small "H's" (as large as five inches tall) were scratched mostly into varnish covering the paintings, but in one case, into the actual pigments. None went through the canvases, and all paintings were successfully repaired. The vandal(s) weren't caught, and BECC denounced the vandalism.

List of defaced works 
 Follower of Rembrandt. Christ with a Staff. 1661
 Gerard David. Rest on the Flight into Egypt. ca. 1512-15
 François Boucher. The Interrupted Sleep. 1750
 Francesco Guardi. Piazza San Marco. Mid- to late 1760s
 Pietro Longhi. Interior Scene. 18th century
 Giovanni Paolo Panini. Ancient Rome. 1757
 Giottino. Portrait of a Man. 1521
 Follower of Botticelli. The Coronation of the Virgin. 
 Jacopo Guarana. Crowning with Thorns. 
 Eugène Boudin. Market in Brittany. 19th century

Responses

Official responses 
Hoving's press release, in which he responds to "all persons who have been offended", responding to the controversy can be read in full via the Thomas J. Watson Library's Digital Archives. Mayor Lindsay, despite being a friend of Hoving's, criticized the Museum for its choices as racist, anti-Semitic, anti-Irish, and anti-Puerto Rican, later threatening to withhold financial support from the Museum if the catalogue were not removed. Hoving included two disclaimers in the catalogue warning of the racism and anti-Semitism within, and Random House (the publisher) included these in bookstore copies, as well as issuing their own apology. State Commissioner of Human Rights Robert Magnum asked that the show be closed "until it reflects a more accurate record of the aspirations, achievements and goals of the black people of New York."

Art criticism 
Art critics were divided in their responses. Many argued whether the Museum should even include exhibits of "sociological documentation", and if that should be considered art or not, or where such an exhibit should be included. Then The New York Times art critic John Canaday admitted he knew little of Harlem culture, and what he did know had been influenced by common perception of Black culture as being a modernization and extension of "plantation" culture, concluding that he was not qualified to judge a show like "Harlem on My Mind". By March 1969, the exhibit was reported to still be drawing large crowds. Almost 75,000 people visited the show during its opening week, and hundreds of thousands more before it closed later in March. Throughout, picketing continued.

Artists and activists 
Artist, writer, and activist Sabra Moore was one of the many artists and activists to join demonstrations against the exhibit. Moore wrote a detailed description of one of the demonstrations in front of the Museum during that time.

Further reading 
 Cahan, Susan E.: Duke University Press (2016) Mounting Frustration: The Art Museum in the Age of Black Power  
Cooks, Bridget R.; University of Massachusetts Press (2011). Exhibiting Blackness: African Americans and the American Art Museum.

References

1969 protests
Harlem
Metropolitan Museum of Art
Vandalized works of art in New York (state)
1969 in art